Budd's Point 20D is an Indian reserve of the Cumberland House Cree Nation in Saskatchewan. It is 85 kilometres south of Flin Flon.

References

Indian reserves in Saskatchewan
Division No. 18, Saskatchewan